Damir Hadžič (born 1 October 1984) is a Slovenian footballer who plays as a defender for Izola.

References

External links
PrvaLiga profile 

1984 births
Living people
People from Izola
Slovenian footballers
Association football defenders
FC Koper players
NK Celje players
NK Krško players
NK Primorje players
Slovenian expatriate footballers
Expatriate footballers in Italy
Slovenian expatriate sportspeople in Italy
Slovenian PrvaLiga players
Slovenian Second League players
Slovenia youth international footballers
Slovenia under-21 international footballers